Stenocyphoninae is a subfamily of beetles (Coleoptera) of the family Scirtidae, containing the single genus Stenocyphon.

Scirtoidea
Beetle subfamilies